David Mark Halligan (4 August 1959 – 13 September 2020) was a New Zealand rugby union player. In 1981, he was selected to play for the New Zealand national side, the All Blacks, against the touring Scottish side, but had to withdraw from the team because of injury two days before the first Test at Carisbrook. He was again selected for the All Blacks squad the following year for the three-Test series against Australia, but remained on the bench.

Halligan died in Mount Maunganui on 13 September 2020, aged 61.

References

1959 births
2020 deaths
People from Putāruru
People educated at King's College, Auckland
University of Otago alumni
New Zealand rugby union players
Otago rugby union players
Auckland rugby union players
Rugby union fullbacks
Rugby union players from Waikato